Erosive pustular dermatitis of the scalp  presents with pustules, erosions, and crusts on the scalp of primarily older Caucasian females, and on biopsy, has a lymphoplasmacytic infiltrate with or without foreign body giant cells and pilosebaceous atrophy.

See also 
Skin lesion
Cicatricial alopecia
 List of cutaneous conditions

References 

Conditions of the skin appendages